Dillwynella voightae is a species of sea snail, a marine gastropod mollusk in the family Skeneidae.

Distribution
This marine species occurs on the bottom of the sea on wood falls and sunken algal holdfasts in the Caribbean Sea and in the Pacific Ocean.

References

External links
 To World Register of Marine Species

voightae
Gastropods described in 2011